Kizhi usually refers to either:

 kizhi or kishi – an ethnonymic suffix among the peoples of the Altai Republic, in north-east Russia, especially
 the Altai-Kizhi ("Altai People") or;
 Kizhi Island in the Karelian Republic (north-west Russia), including
 Kizhi Pogost, a historic site on the island.